Joseph Santos (born 1965) is a contemporary American (European and Filipino descent) artist/watercolorist. He is known for his watercolor paintings of urban and industrial objects. His work has garnered many awards nationally, including the Paul B. Remmey award at the prestigious American Watercolor Society 138th international exhibition in New York City. His paintings have been exhibited in museums throughout the United States, including the Elmhurst Art Museum in Illinois and the Springfield Art Museum in Missouri. His watercolor paintings have also been featured in national publications including Southwest Art, The Artist's magazine and American Art Collector

Life
Joseph Santos was born in Los Angeles, California, where he lived until the age of five when his family moved to Eastern Washington. After graduating from Pasco High School (Pasco, Washington), Joseph attended Golden West College in Southern California (1984–1986) where he studied art technique and design while also working in his fathers art studio. He started working exclusively in watercolor in the late 1980s and in 1999 started to paint the steel and industrial subjects that he is known for. Inspired by the Precisionism art movement, Santos cites Charles Sheeler and Charles Demuth as influences.

Important exhibitions
Luster: Realism and Hyperrealism in Contemporary Automobile and Motorcycle Painting. National Traveling Museum Exhibition, 2018-2021
Industrialism in the 21st Century: Nicole Longnecker Gallery, 2017
Shenzhen International Watercolor Biennial Travel Show 2016 
Shenzhen International Watercolor Biennial Shenzhen Art Museum, Shenzhen, China. 2015
Shenzhen International Watercolor Biennial Travel Show 2014 
Shenzhen International Watercolor Biennial, Shenzhen Art Museum, Shenzhen, China. 2013
"Signage" new paintings by Joe Santos, Elliott Fouts Gallery March 2009  
American Watercolor Society 135th International Exhibition, New York City.
American Watercolor Society 138th International Exhibition, New York City.
American Watercolor Society Traveling Exhibition, 2008.
American Watercolor Society Traveling Exhibition, 2005.
National Watercolor Society 82nd National Exhibition, Southern California.
Transparent Watercolor Society of America Annual National Exhibition. Elmhurst Art Museum, 2004.

Awards
2005- Paul B. Remmey Award- American Watercolor Society Annual Juried Exhibition, New York, N.Y.

Memberships
American Watercolor Society Signature member

References

External links
Southwest Art Magazine 2009
Info on askart.com
Man & Machine" Article, Jan/Feb 2007 issue, The Artist's magazine
Artists website
Artists Studio
Santos' work at Elliott Fouts Gallery

20th-century American painters
American male painters
21st-century American painters
Living people
1965 births
People from Pasco, Washington
Artists from Washington (state)
Artists from Los Angeles
American watercolorists
American artists of Filipino descent
20th-century American male artists